Harmanlı is a town (belde) and municipality in the Gölbaşı District, Adıyaman Province, Turkey. The town is populated by Turks and had a population of 1,585 in 2021. It has both a Alevi and Sunni population.

References

Towns in Turkey
Populated places in Adıyaman Province
Gölbaşı District, Adıyaman